Solenne Figuès (born 6 June 1979 in Villepinte) is a French swimmer.

Figuès represented France in the 1996 Atlanta Olympics, the 2000 Sydney Olympics, and the 2004 Athens Olympics.  She won her first medal, a bronze, in 2000, in the 2000 European Swimming Championship in the 4×200 m freestyle relays.  This was followed by a bronze in swimming in the 2004 Athens Olympics and, in the 2005 FINA Swimming World Cup in Montreal, a gold in the 200 m freestyle.

She also studies physical therapy, which she practices in Toulouse.

References
SWIMNEWS ONLINE - Swimming News, Swim Meet Results, Swimming World ...

1979 births
Living people
French female freestyle swimmers
Olympic swimmers of France
Swimmers at the 1996 Summer Olympics
Swimmers at the 2004 Summer Olympics
Olympic bronze medalists for France
Olympic bronze medalists in swimming
World Aquatics Championships medalists in swimming
European Aquatics Championships medalists in swimming
Medalists at the 2004 Summer Olympics
Mediterranean Games gold medalists for France
Mediterranean Games silver medalists for France
Swimmers at the 1997 Mediterranean Games
Swimmers at the 2005 Mediterranean Games
Universiade medalists in swimming
Mediterranean Games medalists in swimming
Universiade gold medalists for France
Medalists at the 2003 Summer Universiade
20th-century French women
21st-century French women